The Raving Poets was a collective of poets and musicians who held a series of live, weekly poetry with music events in Edmonton, Alberta, Canada. It ran from 2000 to 2010.

Origins 
The Raving Poets had several open mic ‘music and poetry’ precedents in Edmonton, but the actual first ‘music with poetry’ event happened in the summer of the year 2000.

That year, three of the ‘founding fathers’ were board members with the Stroll of Poets Society, an Edmonton poetry group that hosted two annual reading series. Mark Kozub was president, Thomas Trofimuk, Volunteer Coordinator and Gordon McRae, Treasurer. The Board was tasked with finding ways to expand and revitalize the Society, which faced declining membership.

During the May 4th, 2000 Stroll of Poets board meeting, in keeping with the expansion mandate, three new "Subsidiary Roles" were created, Media Liaison, Liaison with other Arts Groups and Open Stage Coordinator. Though both Mark and Thomas were optioned for sharing the role of Media Liaison, it is the Open Stage Coordinator role that gave Mark the impetus to start up something completely new – with Thomas sharing the hosting duties with him.

The new reading series, Poetry Tuesdays ran through February, March, and April 2000. The Backroom Vodka Bar was used as the venue of choice in two of those three months. The ad of the March series ran, “Beware the Odes of March, hosted by Phil, the Cowboy Poet with The Art to Choke Hearts band.” Though Mark and Thomas read during the March series, neither were part of the ‘band’.

The real beginning happened when this ad was posted in the May 2000 Stroll newsletter under the heading "More Chances To Be Involved"

"The Alberta Beatnik (Mark Kozub) and Thomas Trofimuk are looking to host & coordinate a monthly ‘Open Stage’ event down Whyte Avenue, starting in June or July. (The goal is simple: get new members.) If anyone has a lead on a funky Whyte Avenue venue that might need the extra business (and might even pay the Stroll a small fee to boost it), call Mark Kozub at … ASAP"

“The Raving Poets” began as the name of a reading series, but soon came to be thought of as the name of the band, and later, the collective of poets and musicians who performed together on weekday evenings.

On March 23, 2002, Mark, Thomas and Gordon left the Board and the Society for good during the Stroll’s Annual General Meeting. From then on, their energies were directed solely toward the Raving Poets.

Founding Fathers 
 Mark Kozub, bass
 Thomas Trofimuk, keyboards
 Randall Edwards, guitar and synth
 Gordon McRae, drums and percussion
 Michael Gravel, MC

Notable Poets 
Michael Appleby, Ryan Baier, Jocko Benoit, Joe Blow (Todd Anstead), Michelle Boudreau, Natalya Brettle, David C. Brydges, Anton Capri, Dawn Carter, John Chalmers (Revy Man), Christine Comeau, Tim Cusack, Adriana Davies, Corine Demas, Trisia Eddy, Bonnie Enes, Tyler Enfield, Kevin Feeley, Kathy Fisher, Delvina Greig, Corey Hamilton, Margaret Haugen, Jenn Heather, Cathy Hodgson, Michael Hogan, Alison Hurlburt, S.E. Ingraham, Philip Jagger, Wendy Joy, Chris Krueger, Todd Kuziw, Jefferson Lavender, Shelley Lawson, Gary Lee, Rusti Lehay, John Leppard, Mandie Lopatka, J.P. Lorence, Laurie MacFayden, Jan Mann, Aaron J. Marko, Paul McLaughlin (The Middle Poet), Kerry Mulholland, Nerissa, Ubaka Ogbogu, Nicole Pakan, Roy Picou, P.M. Pilarski, Mary Pinkoski, Justin Poulin, Monika Ptak, Ray Rasmussen, Jadon Rempel, Shima Aisha Robinson, Victoria Rohac, Kelly Shepherd, Patti Sinclair Adam Snider, c.t. staples, Suzanne Steele, Lara Thesenvitz, Mingus Tourette, Deborah Vos, Amy Willans, Francis A.  Willey, Rosemary Wilson, Sheri-D Wilson

The Concept 
The Raving Poets was conceived as an open mic poetry event with improvised musical accompaniment. As the jazz poet scenes in the 1993 Mike Myers movie, So I Married an Axe Murderer prove, it was not a new concept. What set the Raving Poets apart was the incredible variety of musical and poetic styles performed. From the wordsmiths, everything from Slam and hip-hop to erotica and nature poetry, with generous doses of politics, confessionals and rants. The musicians matched these forms with equally eclectic styles, from folk, rock and jazz, through ambient, experimental and other electronica.

Series 
 Peace Talks, 2001
 The Beat Goes On, 2002
 Pig Poetry, 2003
 Fall of Love, September 23 to November 25, 2003
 Mumbo Jumbo, A Word Circus, April 6 to August ??, 2004
 Kill Phil, vol. 2, September 7 to December 7, 2004
 Rock the Kasbar, February 8 to April 26, 2006
 Rapture, February 1 to May 31, 2007
 Space Monkey, November 7 to December 12, 2007
 Heart Beat, March 5 to May 28, 2008
 Born to Write, October 15 to December 3, 2008
 Sofa King, April 1 to May 27, 2009
 9½, October 7 to December 2, 2009
 Sotto Voce, April 12 to ??, 20??

Venues 
 The Backroom Vodka Bar, 2003–2006
 The Kasbar Lounge, 2006–2010

Recordings 
 Peace Talks, 8-CD set, 2001
 The Beat Goes On, 8-CD set, 2002
 Pig Poetry, 2-CD set, 2003
 Mumbo Jumbo, A Word Circus, CD, 2004
 The Raving Poets - Remixed, CD, 2007
 Live at the Kasbar, podcast, 2006

The Roar 
The Raving Poets created a festival, The Roar, which ran for two years, 2006 and 2007, between the demise of the Stroll of Poets “stroll” and the advent of the Edmonton Poetry Festival.

External links 
 Ravingpoets.com
 Live at the Kasbar
 Live at the Kasbar on iTunes
 The Raving Poets on YouTube

References

Poetry organizations
Canadian writers' organizations